Ibrahim Nazarov (born April 17, 1988) is an Uzbekistani swimmer, who specialized in freestyle events. A member of SZ Navoi swimming club under the tutelage of his coach Daniya Galandinova, Nazarov represented his nation Uzbekistan at the 2008 Summer Olympics, finishing in the top 60 of the men's 200 m freestyle.

Nazarov qualified for the men's 200 m freestyle at the 2008 Summer Olympics in Beijing, by clearing a B-standard entry time of 1:52.49 from the Russia Open Swimming Championships in Saint Petersburg. He challenged six other swimmers on the second heat, including Olympic veterans Mahrez Mebarek of Algeria and Andrei Zaharov of Moldova. Nazarov raced to sixth place by four seconds behind Kazakhstan's Artur Dilman in a time of 1:56.27. Nazarov failed to advance into the semifinals, as he placed fifty-fourth overall in the prelims.

References

External links
NBC Olympics Profile

1988 births
Living people
Uzbekistani male freestyle swimmers
Olympic swimmers of Uzbekistan
Swimmers at the 2008 Summer Olympics
Swimmers at the 2006 Asian Games
Sportspeople from Tashkent
Asian Games competitors for Uzbekistan
21st-century Uzbekistani people